Tendayi, also spelled Tendai, and its long form Tendayishe or Tendaishe, is a Shona given name from the phrase Kupa kutenda, meaning “give thanks to God”, that may refer to
 Tendai Chatara, Zimbabwean cricketer
 Tendayi Darikwa (born 1991), English football player
 Tendayi Gahamadze (born 1959), Zimbabwean songwriter
 Tendayi Jembere, British actor
 Tendai Fushai, Zimbabwean scientist
 Tendai Mtawarira, South African rugby union player
 Tendaishe Masuka, (born 1977), Global Industrial Engineer

References

See also 
 Jendayi Frazer
 Zendaya, whose name derives from "Tendayi"
 Tendai (disambiguation)

Shona given names